The Canadian Thoroughbred Horse Society (CTHS) is an organization headquartered in Toronto, Ontario, Canada that was founded in 1906 to assist Thoroughbred horse breeders. Since 1982, there have been provincial divisions in Alberta, British Columbia, Manitoba, Ontario, Quebec and Saskatchewan.

References
 Official website for the Canadian Thoroughbred Horse Society

Horse breed registries
Horse racing in Canada
1906 establishments in Ontario